Danova can refer to:

the Latin name of the ancient (now titular) episcopal see of Danaba
Ďanová, a village in Slovakia
Cesare Danova, Italian-born actor